Balacra guillemei is a moth of the  family Erebidae. It was described by Oberthür in 1911. It is found in the Democratic Republic of Congo.

References

Balacra
Moths described in 1911
Erebid moths of Africa